Fjellheim is a surname. Notable people with the surname include:

Freddy Fjellheim (born 1957), Norwegian author 
Frode Fjellheim (born 1959), Norwegian yoiker and musician
Svein Fjellheim (born 1945), Norwegian trade unionist and politician

Norwegian-language surnames